Rising High (Betonrausch) is a 2020 German comedy-drama film directed and written by Cüneyt Kaya. The plot revolves around Viktor (David Kross), Gerry (Frederick Lau) and Nicole (Janina Uhse), who have figured out a way to make money out of the property market in Berlin.

It was released on April 17, 2020, by Netflix.

Plot 
Netflix states the plot is, "Ready to do anything to get rich, a young man upends the Berlin property market with his shady pal, till the good times threaten to destroy it all."

Cast 
 David Kross as Viktor
 Frederick Lau as Gerry
 Dejan Bucin as Nathan
 Janina Uhse as Nicole
 Sophia Thomalla
 Anne Schäfer
 Uwe Preuss as Manfred Bauer
 Jerry Kwarteng
 Silvina Buchbauer as Viktoria Steiner
 Heike Hanold-Lynch as Gabi
 Alexander Yassin
 Jimmy Gutzeit

Release
Rising High was released on April 17, 2020 on Netflix.

References

External links 
 
Rising High on UFA.de (German)
 

2020 films
2020s German-language films
German-language Netflix original films
German comedy-drama films
2020 comedy-drama films